The following elections occurred in the year 1986.

Africa
 1986 Angolan legislative election
 1986 Gabonese presidential election
 1986 Mozambican general election
 1986 Sierra Leonean parliamentary election
 1986 Somali presidential election
 1986 Sudanese parliamentary election
 1986 Togolese presidential election

Asia
 1986 Bangladeshi general election
 1986 Japanese House of Councillors election
 1986 Japanese general election
 1986 Malaysian general election
 1986 North Korean parliamentary election
 1986 Philippine presidential election
 1986 Republic of China legislative election

Australia
 1986 Queensland state election
 1986 Scullin by-election
 1986 Tasmanian state election
 1986 Western Australian state election

Europe
 1986 Dutch general election
 1986 French legislative election
 1986 Portuguese presidential election
 1986 East German general election

Austria
 1986 Austrian legislative election

France
 1986 Brittany regional election
 1986 French regional elections

Spain
 1986 Basque parliamentary election
 1986 Spanish general election

North America

Canada
 1986 Alberta general election
 1986 British Columbia general election
 1986 Edmonton municipal election
 1986 Manitoba general election
 1986 Manitoba municipal elections
 1986 Prince Edward Island general election
 1986 Quebec municipal elections
 1986 Saskatchewan general election
 1986 Winnipeg municipal election

Caribbean
 1986 Barbadian general election
 1986 Dominican Republic presidential election
 1986 Trinidad and Tobago general election

United States
 1986 United States Senate elections
 1986 United States elections
 1986 United States gubernatorial elections

United States gubernatorial
 1986 Alabama gubernatorial election
 1986 California gubernatorial election
 1986 Georgia gubernatorial election
 1986 Maine gubernatorial election
 1986 Massachusetts gubernatorial election
 1986 Michigan gubernatorial election
 1986 Minnesota gubernatorial election
 1986 New York gubernatorial election
 1986 Oregon gubernatorial election
 1986 South Carolina gubernatorial election
 1986 United States gubernatorial elections

United States mayoral
 1986 New Orleans mayoral election

Alabama
 1986 Alabama gubernatorial election
 United States Senate election in Alabama, 1986

Alaska
 United States Senate election in Alaska, 1986

Arizona
 United States Senate election in Arizona, 1986

Arkansas
 United States Senate election in Arkansas, 1986

California
 1986 California gubernatorial election
 United States House of Representatives elections in California, 1986
 United States Senate election in California, 1986

Colorado
 United States Senate election in Colorado, 1986

Connecticut
 United States Senate election in Connecticut, 1986

Florida
 United States Senate election in Florida, 1986

Georgia (U.S. state)
 1986 Georgia gubernatorial election
 United States Senate election in Georgia, 1986

Idaho
 United States Senate election in Idaho, 1986

Illinois
 United States Senate election in Illinois, 1986

Indiana
 United States Senate election in Indiana, 1986

Iowa
 United States Senate election in Iowa, 1986

Louisiana
 1986 New Orleans mayoral election

Maine
 1986 Maine gubernatorial election

Maryland
 United States Senate election in Maryland, 1986

Massachusetts
 1986 Massachusetts general election
 1986 Massachusetts gubernatorial election

Michigan
 1986 Michigan gubernatorial election

Minnesota
 1986 Minnesota gubernatorial election

Missouri
 United States Senate election in Missouri, 1986

Nevada
 United States Senate election in Nevada, 1986

New Hampshire
 United States Senate election in New Hampshire, 1986

New York
 1986 New York gubernatorial election
 United States Senate election in New York, 1986

North Carolina
 United States Senate election in North Carolina, 1986

North Dakota
 United States Senate election in North Dakota, 1986

Ohio
 United States Senate election in Ohio, 1986

Oklahoma
 1986 United States Senate election in Oklahoma

Oregon
 1986 Oregon gubernatorial election
 United States Senate election in Oregon, 1986

Pennsylvania
 United States Senate election in Pennsylvania, 1986

South Carolina
 1986 South Carolina gubernatorial election
 United States House of Representatives elections in South Carolina, 1986
 United States Senate election in South Carolina, 1986

South Dakota
 United States Senate election in South Dakota, 1986

United States House of Representatives
 United States House of Representatives elections in California, 1986
 United States House of Representatives elections in South Carolina, 1986

United States Senate
 1986 United States Senate elections
 United States Senate election in Alaska, 1986
 United States Senate election in Arizona, 1986
 United States Senate election in Arkansas, 1986
 United States Senate election in California, 1986
 United States Senate election in Colorado, 1986
 United States Senate election in Connecticut, 1986
 United States Senate election in Florida, 1986
 United States Senate election in Georgia, 1986
 United States Senate election in Idaho, 1986
 United States Senate election in Illinois, 1986
 United States Senate election in Indiana, 1986
 United States Senate election in Iowa, 1986
 United States Senate election in Maryland, 1986
 United States Senate election in Missouri, 1986
 United States Senate election in Nevada, 1986
 United States Senate election in New Hampshire, 1986
 United States Senate election in New York, 1986
 United States Senate election in North Carolina, 1986
 United States Senate election in North Dakota, 1986
 United States Senate election in Ohio, 1986
 1986 United States Senate election in Oklahoma
 United States Senate election in Oregon, 1986
 United States Senate election in Pennsylvania, 1986
 United States Senate election in South Carolina, 1986
 United States Senate election in South Dakota, 1986
 United States Senate election in Vermont, 1986
 United States Senate election in Washington, 1986
 United States Senate election in Wisconsin, 1986

Vermont
 United States Senate election in Vermont, 1986

Washington (U.S. state)
 United States Senate election in Washington, 1986

Wisconsin
 United States Senate election in Wisconsin, 1986

Oceania

Australia
 1986 Queensland state election
 1986 Scullin by-election
 1986 Tasmanian state election
 1986 Western Australian state election

South America
1986 Falkland Islands status referendum

See also

 
1986
Elections